Florida Airways was an American airline. Founded in part by Eddie Rickenbacker and based in the state of Florida, the airline served the southeastern United States during the mid-1920s.

History 
Florida Airways was founded by Eddie Rickenbacker, Reed Chambers, and Virgil Chinea who later claimed "it was the worst investment he ever made". Several outside investors were brought in including Richard F Hoyt, Anne Morgan, Percy Rockefeller, and Henry Ford who bought 3 of his own Stout 2AT's for the venture. Florida Airways started service on Paxon Field in 1923. Florida Airways started regularly scheduled passenger service on June 1, 1926  The first service was from Tampa to Miami and Jacksonville

Florida Airways was a pioneer airline operating on the CAM (Commercial Air Mail) routes that subsidized early air commerce through airmail contracts. Florida Airways secured the CAM-10 route between Miami and Atlanta. On September 15, 1926 a Florida Airways mail flight on the Tampa - Jacksonville - Atlanta route becomes the first commercial flight to land at Candler Field (forerunner to Atlanta International Airport). Passenger revenue was too low or sparse to solely support an airline. Florida Airways charged $60 for a one way Miami to Jacksonville Ticket in 1926. The number of passengers for 1926 totaled 939. In order to increase revenue, wet letters or even bricks with stamps were mailed back and forth on the airline.

By 1926, Florida Airways sought travel to Cuba to keep solvency. On a business trip to negotiate rights, it was discovered that Juan Trippe had already negotiated exclusive landing rights in Cuba for Pan American Airways a year earlier. Florida Airways ceased operations on 9 June 1927. Two months later, Harold Pitcairn founder of Pitcairn Aviation won the bid for the abandoned Miami-Atlanta airmail contract. Pitcairn Aviation would eventually become a part of Eastern Air Transport, later a part of North American Aviation Corporation, which in turn became Eastern Airlines.

After Florida Airways stopped service, two Stout 2-AT's were purchased by Stout Air Services, which went on to become United Airlines.

Destinations 
Atlanta
Jacksonville
Miami

Fleet 
The Florida Airways fleet consists of the following aircraft as of 1926

Incidents and accidents 

On November 3, 1925 Henry Ford sent off 4 new Stout 2-AT's to Florida with an audience of 5000 spectators from Ford Airport (Dearborn). After a stop in Nashville, Tennessee, the first Stout on takeoff Miss Fort Myers fishtailed on its takeoff run and crashed into Miss Tampa and Miss Miami sparing only Miss St Petersburg. Only three aircraft made it to Florida for initial delivery.

The 1926 Miami hurricane killed 400, and left 50,000 homeless. It blew away a Florida Airways Stout 2-AT Pullman tied down outside.

References 

Airlines based in Florida
Airlines established in 1923
Airlines disestablished in 1926
Defunct airlines of the United States
1923 establishments in Florida